Juan Antonio Señor Gómez (born 26 August 1958 in Madrid) is a Spanish retired footballer who played as a central midfielder, and is the manager of Pontevedra CF.

During his professional career he played mainly for Zaragoza, amassing nearly 400 official appearances in nine years. The scorer of one of Spain's most important goals, he earned more than 40 caps during the 1980s, representing the nation in one World Cup and one European Championship.

Club career
During his career, Real Madrid youth graduate Señor represented professionally CD Ciempozuelos (fourth division), Deportivo Alavés (second) and Real Zaragoza. With the Aragonese team he played 304 La Liga games, scoring 54 goals.

In the 1986–87 season, which featured a second stage, Señor netted 11 times in 43 matches as Zaragoza finish fifth. He also helped the side to the Copa del Rey in 1986, being voted by magazine Don Balón the league's best player in the 1982–83 campaign where he recorded 33 appearances and five goals.

Señor had to retire sooner than expected due to a heart disease, his last season being 1989–90. He subsequently moved into coaching, going on to work with Mérida UD, UD Salamanca, FC Cartagena and CD Logroñés, and also began managing a football campus for children in the Aragonese Pyrenees.

International career
Señor made 41 appearances for Spain, his debut coming on 27 October 1982 in a UEFA Euro 1984 qualifier against Iceland, a 1–0 win in Málaga. Also during that stage, he scored the most important of his six international goals: on 23 December 1983, as the national team needed to win by 11 goals against Malta to qualify, he scored in the 85th in a final 12–1 result in Seville.

Señor was part of the nation's squads at Euro 1984 and the 1986 FIFA World Cup, where he scored another late goal, in a quarter-final penalty shootout loss against Belgium (1–1 after 120 minutes).

International goals

Honours

Club
Zaragoza
Copa del Rey: 1985–86

International
Spain
UEFA European Championship: Runner-up 1984

References

External links
 
 
 
 
 Official football campus website 

1958 births
Living people
Footballers from Madrid
Spanish footballers
Association football midfielders
La Liga players
Segunda División players
Deportivo Alavés players
Real Zaragoza players
Spain amateur international footballers
Spain B international footballers
Spain international footballers
UEFA Euro 1984 players
1986 FIFA World Cup players
Spanish football managers
Segunda División managers
Mérida UD managers
UD Salamanca managers
FC Cartagena managers
CD Logroñés managers
Pontevedra CF managers